Gyrosmilia is a monotypic genus of large polyp stony coral. It is represented by a single species, Gyrosmilia interrupta . It was first described by Christian Gottfried Ehrenberg in 1834 as Manicina interrupta.

Description
It is known to have a "distinctive uniform greenish grey-brown" color. Colonies are either submassive humps or laminar in shape with free margins up to 0.5 meters (1.6 feet) wide. Gyrosmilia interrupts has tentacles that extend only at night.

Distribution and habitat
It can be found in scattered pockets throughout eastern African islands and coastline such as Madagascar, Eritrea, the Aldabran atoll, Réunion, Kenya, Mozambique, Mauritius, South Africa, and parts of the Red Sea in uncommon abundance.

It prefers shallow coral reefs that are protected from strong surface wave action.

References 

Euphylliidae
Scleractinia genera
Cnidarians of the Indian Ocean
Fauna of the Red Sea
Marine fauna of Africa
Marine fauna of Western Asia
Taxa named by Christian Gottfried Ehrenberg
Taxa named by Henri Milne-Edwards
Taxa named by Jules Haime
Monotypic cnidarian genera